Anahuac High School is a public high school located in the city of Anahuac, Texas (USA). It is part of the Anahuac Independent School District located in west central Chambers County and classified as a 3A school by the UIL. In 2015, the school was rated "Met Standard" by the Texas Education Agency.

Athletics
The Anahuac Panthers compete in the following sports:

Baseball
Basketball
Cross Country
Football
Golf
Powerlifting
Soccer
Softball
Tennis
Track and Field
Volleyball

Notable alumni

Mikhael Ricks - Fitness trainer and former NFL football tight end for the Dallas Cowboys, Detroit Lions, Kansas City Chiefs & San Diego Chargers

References

External links
Anahuac Independent School District

Public high schools in Texas
Schools in Chambers County, Texas